Cigarette Boats is an EP by American rapper Curren$y and producer Harry Fraud. It was released for online download on July 10, 2012.  XXL named it the "2012 EP of the Year."

Track listing
 All songs produced by Harry Fraud

References

2012 EPs
Currensy albums
Albums produced by Harry Fraud